Gordonia singaporeana is a species of plant in the family Theaceae. It is a tree found in Peninsular Malaysia and Singapore. It is threatened by habitat loss.

References

singaporeana
Trees of Malaya
Vulnerable plants
Taxonomy articles created by Polbot